Maurice Ferrier (8 November 1901 – 9 September 1973) was a Swiss tennis player. He competed in the men's singles and doubles events at the 1924 Summer Olympics.

References

External links
 

1901 births
1973 deaths
Swiss male tennis players
Olympic tennis players of Switzerland
Tennis players at the 1924 Summer Olympics
Tennis players from Geneva